Johny Goedert (17 June 1929–17 June 2013) was a Luxembourgian racing cyclist. He rode in the 1952 Tour de France.

References

1929 births
2013 deaths
Luxembourgian male cyclists